Mondo Music Corporation is a record label in Lusaka that produces recordings by some of Zambia's the most popular musicians, including Amayenge, Danny, K'Millian, Exile, JK, Shatel, Nathan Nyirenda, Jojo Mwangaza, Lilly T.[Tribal Cousin Ackson Chulu, Sydney Kasonde]  

The company was started in 1998 by Chisha Folotiya, its first release being a gospel album by the Omega Singers.  

The company's motto is "The Nation's Music Leaders", which they try to live up to by offering releases for all age groups and demographics.

See also
 List of record labels

References

External links
 Mondo Music Online Store

African record labels
Music organisations based in Zambia
Companies based in Lusaka